Carol Kane (born October 1966) is a British businesswoman, the co-founder and joint CEO of Boohoo.com.

Early life
Carol Kane was born in October 1966. She comes from a working-class background, the youngest of four children of a builder father.

Career
Kane started her career as a designer, going to Berkshire College of Art & Design in Maidenhead Berkshire, before moving to London.In 1993, she took a position working as a senior designer for Pinstripe Clothing.

Boohoo was founded in 2006 by Carol Kane and Mahmud Kamani, who are joint chief executives.

Boohoo also runs boohooMAN.com, PrettyLittleThing.com and NastyGal.com and all of the brands are targeted at 16-24 year olds.

In April 2017, Boohoo announced that its profits had almost doubled to £31 million on sales up by 51% to almost £300 million. When the company was floated on the stock market in 2014, it was valued at £560 million, and is worth about £2 billion as of April 2017.

Personal life
Kane has a long-term partner of 30 years and they live in Stafford with their four dogs.

References

1966 births
Living people
British retail company founders
English businesspeople in retailing
English company founders
English chief executives
British women chief executives
21st-century English businesspeople
21st-century English businesswomen